Government TB and Chest Hospital is all so called as Government Hospital for Chest and Communicable Diseases is located at Pedda Waltair, Visakhapatnam. its one of the important government hospital in the City.

Services
The Government Hospital for Chest and Communicable Diseases gave services for Swine influenza, Pneumonia, Interstitial lung disease and TB Cases. the hospital shares out of 460 government doctors in the city some important percentages of doctors. this hospital is the only test multi-drug-resistant tuberculosis (MDR-TB)samples in the state of Andhra Pradesh before establishing the testing center of Anantapur. and this hospipitla listed in Government of India National Health Mission.

References

Tuberculosis in India
Hospitals in Visakhapatnam
1961 establishments in Andhra Pradesh
Hospitals established in 1961